Dadigildo Portulez Carvalho Fernandes Cravid, known as just Gil Carvalho, is a Santomean footballer who currently plays for Ramsgate and the São Tomé and Príncipe national team.

Club career
Carvalho began his career in the academy of Tonbridge Angels FC. By 2017 he had also made five or six league appearances for the first team. In February 2017 he joined Sittingbourne F.C. of the Isthmian League on the recommendation by former teammate Conrad Lee. Carvalho made an immediate impression on Sittingbourne manager Nick Davis.

For the 2018–2019 season, Carvalho made seven league appearances, scoring one goal, for Corinthian-Casuals. In January 2019 the player joined Ramsgate. Nine months later he moved to East Grinstead Town. During his first season which the club he scored twenty three appearances and scored six goals before the season was ended by the COVID-19 pandemic. Following the season, his contract was renewed for another year. In November 2020 he joined league rivals Haywards Heath Town.

In 2020 Carvalho left Haywards Heath Town after nearly two years. He opted to join Hastings United following his departure. After his stint at Hastings, he left the club and joined Ashford United in October 2022.

In January 2023, Carvalho returned to former club, and Ashford's promotion rivals, Ramsgate.

International career
Carvalho was born in Portugal to a father from São Tomé and Príncipe before finally settling in London. He received his first international call-up in summer 2022 for São Tomé and Príncipe's 2023 Africa Cup of Nations qualification matches. He went on to make his senior international debut on 9 June 2022 in a  match against Guinea-Bissau.

International career statistics

References

External links
National Football Teams profile
Global Sports Archive profile
Ashford United profile

1997 births
Living people
Association football midfielders
São Tomé and Príncipe footballers
São Tomé and Príncipe international footballers
Portuguese footballers
Portuguese people of São Tomé and Príncipe descent
Tonbridge Angels F.C. players
Phoenix Sports F.C. players
Sittingbourne F.C. players
Corinthian-Casuals F.C. players
East Grinstead Town F.C. players
Ramsgate F.C. players
Haywards Heath Town F.C. players
Hastings United F.C. players
Ashford United F.C. players
Isthmian League players